An IBM Fellow is a position at IBM by the CEO. Typically only four to nine (eleven in 2014) IBM Fellows are appointed each year, in May or June. Fellow is the highest honor a scientist, engineer, or programmer at IBM can achieve.

Overview

The IBM Fellows program was founded in 1962 by Thomas Watson Jr., as a way to promote creativity among the company's "most exceptional" technical professionals and is granted in recognition of outstanding and sustained technical achievements and leadership in engineering, programming, services, science, design and technology. The first appointments were made in 1963.  

The criteria for appointment are stringent and take into account only the most-significant technical achievements. In addition to a history of extraordinary accomplishments, candidates must also be considered to have the potential to make continued contributions. Francis E. Hamilton is believed to be the first IBM Fellow, appointed in 1963 for amongst other things his work on the development of the IBM 650. In 1989, Fran Allen became the first female IBM Fellow.

IBM Fellows are given broad latitude to identify and pursue projects in their area of expertise.

, only 331 IBMers have earned the IBM Fellow distinction, and 84 of them remain active IBM employees. IBM Fellows have generated over 9,329 patents, thousands of government and professional citations, received five Nobel Prizes and five Turing Awards, and have a massive store of published research in scientific journals.

List of IBM Fellows
In chronological order, :

Francis E. Hamilton (1963)
Ronald D. Dodge (1963)
C.R. Doty, Sr. (1963)
Clyde J. Fitch (1963)
John Backus (1963)
Genung L. Clapper (1963)
Lewellyn H. Thomas (1963)
Ralph L. Palmer (1963)
Ralph E. Gomory (1964)
Robert Henle (1964)
James A. Weidenhammer (1964)
Laurence A. Wilson (1964)
Jonas E. Dayger (1964)
Gene Amdahl (1965)
Reynold B. Johnson (1965)
S.W. Dunwell (1966)
George T. Judson (1966)
James M. Brownlow (1967)
George F. Daly (1967)
Wallace Eckert (1967)
Leo Esaki (1967)
Richard L. Garwin (1967)
Jean Ghertman (1967)
Evon C. Greanias (1967)
Edward J. Rabenda (1967)
Nathaniel Rochester (1967)
Walter Buslik (1968)
L.R. Harper (1968) 
Peter Sorokin (1968)
Leon E. Palmer
E. Alan Brown (1969)
H.G. Kolsky (1969)
Rolf Landauer (1969)
Herman Goldstine (1969)
Jacob Riseman (1969)*- see Directory
Charles E. Owen (1969)
Wouter Vanderkulk (1969)
D. DeWitt (1970)
Enrico Clementi (1970)
Victor R. Witt (1970)
Kenneth E. Iverson (1971)
J. B. Gunn (1971)
Joseph C. Logue (1971)
Bill Beausoleil (1972)
John Cocke (1972)
Shmuel Winograd (1972)
Harlan Mills (1973)
R.G. Brewer (1973)
Robert A. Nelson (1973)
William E. Harding (1973)
Dean Eastman (1974)
Jack Harker (1974)
Benoît Mandelbrot (1974)
Charles F. Borteck (1974)
Harold Fleisher (1974)
Otto G. Folberth (1974)
A.R. Heller (1975)
Henri Nussbaumer (1975)
Joseph P. Pawletko (1975)
James H. Pomerene (1976)
Edgar F. Codd (1976)
Heinz Zemanek (1976)
Carl A. Queener (1976)
Donald K. Rex (1977)
Thomas H Simpson (1977)
Alec N. Broers (1977)
Alan J. Hoffman (1978)
Robert Dennard (1979)
Siegfried K. Wiedmann (1979)
David E. Cuzner (1979)
David A. Thompson (1980)
Richard E. Blahut (1980)
George Radin (1980) 
Robert E. Pattison (1980)
Donald Seraphim (1981)
Edward H. Sussenguth (1981)
Janusz S. Wilczynski (1981)
K. Alex Müller (1982)
Edward B. Eichelberger (1982)
Richard Chu (1983)
Alan Fowler (1983)
Charles Denis Mee (1983)
Werner Kulcke (1983)
James P. Gray (1984)
Allan L. Scherr (1984)
Mu-Yue (Ben) Hsiao (1984)
Rao R. Tummala (1984)
Gottfried Ungerboeck (1984)
Hans Pfeiffer (1985)
Jerry Woodall (1985)
G. Glenn Henry (1985)
C. Grant Willson (1985)
Gerd Binnig (1986)
Dale L. Critchlow (1986)
James M. Kasson (1986)
Heinrich Rohrer (1986)
Arvind M. Patel (1986)
Lubomyr Romankiw (1986)
Georg Bednorz (1987)
Edwin R. Lassettre (1987)
Paul E. Totta (1987)
Karl Hermann (1987)
Nick Pippenger (1987)
Bernard R. Aken, Jr. (1988)
Michael Hatzakis (1988)
James L. Walsh (1988)
Larry Loucks (1989)
Alfred Cutaia (1989)
Frances E. Allen (1989)
Donald Haderle (1989)
Russell Lange (1989)
Michael F. Cowlishaw (1990)
J. Kent Howard (1990)
Ellis L. Johnson (1990)
Howard L. Kalter (1990)
Randolph G. Scarborough (1990)
Marc Auslander (1991)
Richard Baum (1991)
Tak Ning (1991)
H. Bernhard Pogge (1991)
Paul H. Bardell (1991)
Bernard Meyerson (1992)
Don Eigler (1993)
Peter Kogge (1993)
Anthony Temple (1993)
Charles R. Hoffman (1993)
Martin E. Hopkins (1993)
James T Brady (1993)
Diane Pozefsky (1994)
Patricia Selinger (1994)
Celia Yeack-Scranton (1994)
Johann Greschner (1994)
Richard R. Oehler (1994)
Charles H. Bennett (1995)
Mark E. Dean (1995)
Michael D. Swanson (1995)
Ching H. Tsang (1995)
Brian E. Clark (1996)
Bijan Davari (1996)
James Rymarczyk (1996)
Ted Selker (1996)
Bruce Lindsay (1996)
Yutaka Tsukada (1996)
Ramesh Agarwal (1997)
Jean Calvignac (1997)
C. Mohan (1997)
Ramesh C. Agarwal (1997)
Cesar A. Gonzales (1998)
Steven R. Hetzler (1998)
Tze-Chiang Chen (1999)
Irene Greif (1999)
Alex Morrow (1999)
Stuart Parkin (1999)
Hamid Pirahesh (1999)
Gururaj S. Rao (1999)
Nicholas Shelness (1999)
Carl J. Anderson (2000)
Josephine M. Cheng (2000)
H. Kumar Wickramasinghe (2000)
Ravi K. Arimilli (2001)
Donald F. Ferguson (2001)
Jai M. Menon (2001)
Joan L. Mitchell (2001)
Arimasa Naitoh (2001)
Jeffrey M. Nick (2001)
Ghavam Shahidi (2001)
Rakesh Agrawal (2002)
Michael H. Hartung (2002)
James A. Kahle (2002)
Maurice J. Perks (2002)
Anthony A. Storey (2002)
Grady Booch (2003)
Donald D. Chamberlin (2003)
George M. Galambos (2003)
Rodney A. Smith (2003)
Charles F. Webb (2003) 
Phaedon Avouris (2004)
Curt L. Cotner (2004)
David L. Harame (2004)
Audrey A. Helffrich (2004)
Kevin A. Stoodley (2004)
Evangelos S. Eleftheriou (2005)
Larry M. Ernst (2005)
Ed Kahan (2005)
Bradley D. McCredie (2005)
Yun Wang (2005)
Thomas M. Bradicich (2006)
John Maxwell Cohn (2006)
Gennaro A. Cuomo (2006)
Daniel C. Edelstein (2006)
Alan Gara (2006)
Ray Harishankar (2006)
Kerrie L. Holley (2006)
Carol A. Jones (2006)
Brenda L. Dietrich (2007)
David B. Lindquist (2007)
Martin P. Nally (2007)
Edward J. Seminaro (2007)
Mark N. Wegman (2007)
Chris C. Winter (2007)
Emmanuel Crabbé (2008)
Robert H. High Jr. (2008)
Hiroshi Ito (2008)
Susan L. Miller-Sylvia (2008)
David Nahamoo (2008)
Pratap Pattnaik (2008)
Thomas L. Seevers (2008)
Moshe Yanai (2008)
Harry M. Yudenfriend (2008)
Nicholas M. Donofrio (2008)
Chieko Asakawa (2009) 
Laura M. Haas (2009)
Michael A. Kaczmarski (2009)
Hung Q. Le (2009)
Roger R. Schmidt (2009)
Martín-J Sepúlveda (2009)
Satya P. Sharma (2009)
Tim J. Vincent (2009)
James C. Colson (2010)
Jeffrey A. Frey (2010)
Alfred Grill (2010)
Subramanian Iyer (2010)
Anant D. Jhingran (2010)
Charles Johnson (2010)
David Ferrucci (2011)
Renato Recio (2011)
Bradford Brooks (2011)
Steven W Hunter (2011)
Nagui Halim (2011)
Stefan Pappe (2011)
Wolfgang Roesner (2011)
Bob Blainey (2011)
Luba Cherbakov (2012)
Paul Coteus (2012)
Ronald Fagin (2012)
Vincent Hsu (2012)
Jeff Jonas (2012)
Ruchir Puri (2012)
Balaram Sinharoy (2012)
Neil Bartlett (2013)
Jon Casey (2013)
Monty Denneau (2013)
Jason McGee (2013)
John Ponzo (2013)
Heike Riel (2013)
Dinesh Verma (2013)
Chandu Visweswariah (2013)
Sandy Bird (2014) 
Rhonda Childress (2014) 
Alessandro Curioni (2014) 
Tamar Eilam (2014) 
Mike Haydock (2014) 
Namik Hrle (2014) 
Dharmendra Modha (2014) 
Aleksandra Mojsilović (2014) 
Krishna Ratakonda (2014) 
Shivakumar Vaithyanathan (2014) 
Andy Walls (2014) 
Donna Dillenberger (2015) 
Chitra Dorai (2015) 
Michael Factor (2015) 
Steve Fields (2015) 
Mickey Iqbal (2015) 
Bala Rajaraman (2015) 
Berni Schiefer (2015) 
James Sexton (2015) 
Jing Shyr (2015) 
John Smith (2015) 
Mac Devine (2016) 
Blaine Dolph (2016) 
Stacy Joines (2016)  
Shankar Kalyana (2016) 
Adam Kocoloski (2016) 
Bill Kostenko (2016) 
JR Rao (2016) 
Salim Roukos (2016) 
Ajay Royyuru (2016) 
Gosia Steinder (2016) 
Tanveer Syeda-Mahmood (2016) 
 Charlie Hill (2017) 
 Dakshi Agrawal (2017)
 Ed Calusinski (2017)
 Hillery Hunter (2017)
 Hugo M. Krawczyk (2017)
 Matt Huras (2017)
 Matthias Steffen (2017)
 Rachel Reinitz (2017)
 Sam Lightstone (2017)
 Sridhar Muppidi (2017)
Eric Herness (2017)
 Harry Kolar (2018)
 Jay Gambetta (2018)
 Jianying Hu (2018)
 Kyle Brown (2018)
 Mike Williams (2018)
 Paul Taylor (2018)
 Teresa Hamid (2018)
 Vijay Narayanan (2018)
 Ann Corrao (2019)
 Chris Ferris (2019)
 Elpida Tzortzatos (2019)
 Gustavo Stolovitzky (2019)
 Laxmi Parida (2019)
 Ram Viswanathan (2019)
 Rama Akkiraju (2019)
 Rashik Parmar (2019)
Mohamed Ahmed (2020)
Ajay Apte (2020)
Andreas Bieswanger (2020)
Catherine Crawford (2020)
Nduwuisi Emuchay (2020)
Marc Fiammante (2020)
Kailash Gopalakrishnan (2020)
Shalini Kapoor (2020)
Jim Olson (2020)
Emi Olsson (2020)
Francesca Rossi (2020)
Ranjan Sinha (2020)
Faried Abrahams (2021)
Roland Barcia (2021)
Sergey Bravyy (2021)
Oliver Dial (2021)
Andrew Hately (2021)
Nataraj Nagaratnam (2021)
Tetsuya Nikami (2021)
Maja Vuković (2021)
Vita Bortnikov (2022)
Jerry Chow (2022)
Christian Jacobi (2022)
AB Vijay Kumar (2022)
Marcel Mitran (2022)
Rosalind Radcliffe (2022)

Notes

References
The Corporate Technical Recognition Event (CTRE) commemorative book for each year lists the IBM Fellows designated in that year. In 2009, a similar Corporate Technical Recognition (CTR) book was published, but there was no CTRE. The following have been used to verify the names and dates for those years in the list above:
IBM CTRE Book, June 5–8, 1984, San Francisco, California
IBM CTRE Book, May 11–14, 1987, Orlando, Florida
IBM CTRE Book, May 16–19, 1988
IBM CTRE Book, June 4–7, 1990, San Diego, California
IBM CTRE Book, June 5–8, 1995, San Diego, California
IBM CTRE Book, June 9–12, 1998, San Francisco, California
IBM CTRE Book, June 8–11, 1999, Naples, Florida
IBM CTRE Book, June 5–8, 2000
IBM CTRE Book, May 29–June 1, 2001, Palm Beach, Florida
IBM CTRE Book, June 4–7, 2002, Naples, Florida
IBM CTRE Book, June 2–5, 2003, Scotsdale, Arizona
IBM CTRE Book, May 25–28, 2004, Boca Raton, Florida
IBM CTRE Book, May 24–27, 2005
IBM CTRE Book, May 23–26, 2006
IBM CTRE Book, May 14–17, 2007
IBM CTRE Book, May 12–15, 2008, Phoenix, Arizona
IBM CTR Book, individually distributed, 2009
IBM CTR Book, individually distributed, 2010

External links

 IBM Fellows
 IBM Fellows Directory

Fellow
 

he:IBM#עמית IBM